Jose Bernardo "Joy" Carpio (born May 7, 1958) is a retired Filipino professional basketball player who played in the Philippine Basketball Association.

High School and College Career

Carpio teamed up with Fritz Gaston, Steve Watson, future pro teammate Padim Israel and Chito Narvasa as a 6’4” center-forward for the Ateneo Blue Eagles from 1974 to 1977, winning back-to-back NCAA titles in 1975 and 1976. He also earned Most Valuable Player honors in 1977.

Professional career

Carpio joined the Crispa Redmanizers and learned from the team's resident stars like Atoy Co, Freddie Hubalde, Abet Guidaben and Philip Cezar. He was a reliable off-the-bench player as Crispa constantly battled Toyota for PBA trophies. In 1983, he would join a powerhouse offensive team in Great Taste, which boasted of a very promising center in Manny Victorino, 3-time MVP Bogs Adornado (acquired from the disbanded U/tex team) and sensational Fil-Am rookie Ricardo Brown. Carpio faced his former team in two straight championship series (the Reinforced and the Open), losing both to the Grand Slam-winning Redmanizers.  Great Taste, however, exacted sweet revenge against Crispa in the Third Conference of the following year, en route to three straight titles extending all the way to the 1985 season.  While playing for the Coffee Makers, he earned the moniker "The Scavenger" from commentator Pinggoy Pengson for his penchant for collaring offensive rebounds and following up on missed shots as well as recovering loose balls.  After spending the tailend of his career with Seven-Up, he was forced to end his playing days after nagging knee injuries could no longer be repaired. He spent 13 seasons in the PBA.

Life after Basketball

Carpio currently works as a public relations officer in the Commission on Elections.

References

1958 births
Philippines men's national basketball team players
Filipino men's basketball players
1978 FIBA World Championship players
Living people
Centers (basketball)
Ateneo Blue Eagles men's basketball players
Basketball players from Manila
Power forwards (basketball)
Crispa Redmanizers players
Great Taste Coffee Makers players
TNT Tropang Giga players